Same-sex marriage has been legally recognized in the U.S. state of New York since July 24, 2011 under the Marriage Equality Act. The Act does not have a residency restriction, as some similar laws in other states do. It allows religious organizations to decline to officiate at same-sex wedding ceremonies.

In 2006, the New York Court of Appeals ruled that the New York State Constitution does not require same-sex marriage rights and left the question of recognition to the State Legislature. Following the 2006 court decision, the New York State Assembly passed same-sex marriage legislation in 2007, 2009, and 2011. However, the New York Senate rejected such legislation in a 38–24 vote on December 2, 2009. In June 2011, same-sex marriage legislation passed both the House and the Senate; it was signed by Governor Andrew Cuomo on June 24, 2011, and took effect on July 24, 2011.

New York became the sixth U.S. state, and the seventh U.S. jurisdiction (after the District of Columbia), to license same-sex marriages.

History

1970s activism
In 1970s, members of Gay Activists Alliance carried out a zap at the New York City Marriage License Bureau demanding marriage rights for gays. The direct action was in response to Government discrimination against ceremonial same sex unions that had been carried out in a church where GAA used as a meeting space. Jim Owles was the founding president of GAA, described as the largest militant gay rights organization in the United States. Videos of the action exist on YouTube.

An express advocacy group 
Gay activist Jesús Lebrón worked with other activists, including Brendan Fay, for fight for same-sex marriage rights. Lebrón was a founder of Marriage Equality New York, an advocacy group.  MENY would later play an instrumental role in shaping public opinion and lobbying for passage of the Marriage Equality Act of New York.

New Paltz marriages
On February 27, 2004, New Paltz Mayor Jason West married 25 same-sex couples in front of the New Paltz village hall. Not long thereafter, the Ulster County district attorney charged West with nineteen misdemeanors in connection with these marriages. A court later dismissed the charges against West, a ruling which the state appealed. Ulster County Court Judge J. Michael Bruhn ruled in favor of the state, reinstating the charges against West, arguing that this criminal case did not concern whether the state constitution mandated same-sex marriage, but rather whether West violated his oath of office in performing illegal marriages. The May 2005 charges against West were reinstated; these were dropped by the prosecutor on July 12. After Liberty Counsel filed a civil lawsuit challenging the validity of the marriages, a state court judge issued a permanent injunction barring West from solemnizing same-sex marriages.

On February 27, 2004, Nyack, New York, Mayor John Shields announced that he would recognize the New Paltz marriages and on March 1, 2004, Ithaca Mayor Carolyn K. Peterson declared that she would recognize same-sex marriages performed in other jurisdictions.

Two days later, then-Attorney General of New York Eliot Spitzer, a supporter of same-sex marriage, issued an "informal opinion" stating that municipal clerks should not issue marriage licenses to same-sex couples since the New York State Legislature had not intended for the domestic relations law to cover same-sex couples.

Lawsuits 
Shortly after Attorney General Spitzer's informal opinion was issued, five separate lawsuits were filed contesting the constitutionality of New York's opposite-sex definition of marriage. At the trial level, four failed and one succeeded (though it was stayed and later reversed). At the intermediate appellate level, four failed and one was not decided. The cases were all rolled into one and heard by the Court of Appeals, the state's highest court, on May 31, 2006. On July 6, 2006, the Court of Appeals in Hernandez v. Robles decided 4-2 that existing New York law did not permit same-sex marriages and that there is no state constitutional right to same-sex marriage.

Following the Hernandez v Robles decision, the focus of the same-sex marriage battle shifted to the executive and legislative branches of government. During his successful campaign for Governor of New York, Attorney General Spitzer said that he would push to legalize same-sex marriage if elected, and he proposed legislation to that effect to the State Legislature on April 27, 2007. This legislation passed in the State Assembly on June 19, 2007, but the State Senate took no action and returned it to the Assembly.

In February 2008, the Supreme Court, Appellate Division, Fourth Department ruled unanimously in Martinez v. County of Monroe that because New York legally recognizes out-of-state marriages of opposite-sex couples, it must do the same for same-sex couples. On May 6, 2008, the Court of Appeals declined to hear Monroe County's appeal. In November 2008, Monroe County announced that it would not pursue any further appeals of the Appellate Division's decision.
5

In June 2006, Westchester County Executive Andrew Spano issued executive order No. 3, stating that Westchester County would officially recognize out-of-state marriages of same-sex couples the same way it currently recognizes marriages of different-sex couples.  ADF plaintiffs filed a complaint (Godfrey v Spano) and motions for a preliminary injunction and a temporary restraining order against the county executive. The supreme court of Westchester County denies the motion for a temporary restraining order.
November 2006 Lambda Legal files a motion to intervene in the proceeding on behalf of Michael Sabatino and Robert Voorheis, a couple married in Canada.  
December 2006 Lambda Legal and the county executive independently file motions to dismiss plaintiffs’ complaint and in opposition to the plaintiffs’ motion for preliminary injunction.
January 2007 ADF plaintiffs amend their complaint. Lambda Legal and the county executive file motions to dismiss this amended complaint.
March 2007  The supreme court of Westchester County dismisses plaintiffs’ complaint and denies plaintiffs’ motion for preliminary injunction, ruling that the county executive’s order was legally issued and consistent with New York law.
April 2007 ADF appeals to the New York Appellate Division, Second Department on behalf of three Westchester County taxpayers. Sabatino and Voorheis are permitted to intervene as defendants in the case.
June 2008 In oral arguments at the Appellate Division, Lambda Legal defends Spano's responsibility to adhere to New York law.
December 2008 Victory! The New York Appellate Division affirms dismissal of the case, confirming that Westchester County Executive Spano lawfully recognized out-of-state marriages of same-sex couples.
March 2009 New York's highest court, the Court of Appeals, accepts the case for review following petition by the ADF.
October 2009 Lambda Legal argues before the New York Court of Appeals, the state’s highest court, on behalf of Sabatino and Voorheis.
November 2009  The New York Court of Appeals rules that Westchester County could lawfully extend government benefits to same-sex couples in out-of-state marriages. Whether New York same-sex couples will be permitted to marry in their own home state lies in the hands of the New York State Senate.

Civil disobedience campaign
 
After the failed effort to pass marriage equality through the New York State legislature in 2009, LGBTQ civil rights activists escalated the fight for equal, civil rights almost immediately in 2010.  Activists formed a direct action group named, Queer Rising, and they staged a protest outside the New York City marriage bureau.   Those activists then increased the number of direct action protests, such as blocking traffic,  and they succeeded in putting the issue of marriage equality on the social and legislative agenda for over a year.  Queer Rising inspired the creation or actions of other LGBTQ or civil rights groups that, likewise, put pressure on the Government to enact marriage equality.  When it was revealed that the Catholic Church was lobbying against passage of marriage equality, activists protested outside St. Patrick's Cathedral to demand marriage equality.  Some of the activists, who led or participated in the direct-action that was key to the movement for marriage equality, included Alan Bonville, Iana Di Bona, Bob the Drag Queen, Honey La Bronx, Jake Goodman, Rich Murray, Natasha Dillon, and many others.
 
Activists created an environment of urgency for the Government to act.
 
Against this backdrop, the activists themselves began to exert pressure on Government Officials to pass marriage equality legislation in New York State. In 2009, one of the Electeds, who had voted against the marriage equality bill, such as then State Sen. Shirley Huntley (D-Queens), was targeted for a direct action protest by the group Connecting Rainbows in April 2011. As the New York State legislative session approached the end of its legislative year, some lobbying for final votes took place.

Legislative activity

Same-sex marriage legislation passed the New York State Assembly for the first time on June 19, 2007.

On March 12, 2008, Eliot Spitzer resigned from his position as Governor of New York. Following Spitzer's resignation, Lieutenant Governor David Paterson was sworn in as the 55th Governor of New York on March 17, 2008 by New York Chief Judge Judith Kaye. On April 9, 2008, Paterson pledged that he would continue to push for same-sex marriage legislation. He said he was "proud to have run on a ticket with now-former Governor Eliot Spitzer that was the first in the country to advocate for marriage equality and to win on that premise." "We will push on and bring full marriage equality in New York State", Paterson said.

On November 4, 2008, the Democratic Party gained a majority in the New York State Senate. Following the elections, three dissenting Senate Democrats declined to assure Senate Democratic leader Malcolm Smith that they would vote for him as Senate majority leader when the Senate convened in January 2009. In December 2008, an agreement was allegedly reached between Senator Smith and the so-called "Gang of Three"; reports indicated that as part of the deal, Senator Smith agreed not to bring same-sex marriage legislation to a floor vote in the Senate during the 2009–2010 legislative session. However, on December 10, 2008, Senator Smith announced that the alleged agreement with three Democratic dissidents had been abandoned, and confirmed that he would not pledge to hold off on a same-sex marriage bill in the upcoming session. Senator Smith's decision placed control of the Senate by the Democratic Party in doubt, thus jeopardizing the passage of same-sex marriage legislation (since the Senate Republican leadership was opposed to same-sex marriage). After reaching an agreement with three Democratic dissidents, Malcolm Smith was voted Senate Majority Leader on January 7, 2009.

A bill to legalize same-sex marriage passed the New York State Assembly a second time in 2009. Later in 2009, Senator Thomas Duane (D-Manhattan) claimed that he had lined up support from a sufficient number of senators to pass same-sex marriage legislation, though opponents disagreed. Senator Malcolm Smith stated he would not put the bill to a vote until he was sure it would pass.

While same-sex marriage advocates declared that same-sex marriage would pass the Senate by the end of June 2009, the bill was not debated and voted upon until December of that year. On December 2, 2009, same-sex marriage legislation was defeated on the floor of the New York State Senate by a vote of 24 to 38; no Republican voted yes, eight Democrats voted no. The Daily News described the defeat as a "major blow", while The New York Times stated that the defeat "all but ensures that the issue is dead in New York until at least 2011, when a new legislature will be installed." Elected officials and observers opined that the results of a 2009 special election in New York's 23rd Congressional District — in which a Republican candidate who had voted for same-sex marriage withdrew her candidacy in the face of a challenge from a Conservative Party candidate — affected the marriage vote in the Senate.

In late 2010, before the January 2011 expiration of his term as governor, David Paterson reached out to members of the New York State Senate in an attempt to gauge support for the passage of same-sex marriage legislation during a lame-duck session of the Legislature; however, the Governor came to the conclusion that passage of the bill during the lame-duck session was not feasible. When asked what would have to occur in order for same-sex marriage to be legalized in New York, Governor Paterson responded, "Get rid of the lobbyists", and added that same-sex marriage advocates had forced a Senate floor vote prematurely in December 2009.

Marriage Equality Act 

On June 15, 2011, the New York State Assembly passed the Marriage Equality Act, a bill to legalize same-sex marriage in New York, by a margin of 80 to 63; this was a smaller margin of victory than three same-sex marriage bills had attained in the Assembly in prior years. In the Republican-controlled Senate, three Democrats and two Republicans who had voted against the 2009 bill indicated that their positions had changed and that they would support the legislation. The Senate passed the bill on June 24 by a 33–29 vote, with 29 Democrats and four Republicans voting in favor of it.

Governor Andrew Cuomo signed the Marriage Equality Act into law on June 24, 2011. The definition of marriage in the state of New York was amended, and the following language was added to New York's marriage statute:
 The law took effect on July 24, 2011. The Marriage Equality Act does not contain a residency restriction, as some other states do; also, it allows religious organizations to decline to officiate at same-sex wedding ceremonies.

Reactions 

 
The bill's passage was celebrated by gay rights supporters both in New York and nationwide. The New York Times responded with an editorial backing the law saying, "New York State has made a powerful and principled choice." Gay pride parades in celebration were held across the United States. Gay rights supporters expressed a belief that the legalization in New York would lead to legalization elsewhere.

The National Organization for Marriage pledged to spend $2 million in the 2012 elections to defeat the four Republicans and three Democrats who previously stated opposition to same-sex marriage but voted for the bill. The Conservative Party of New York said it would withdraw support for any candidate who voted for the bill. In addition to action from opponents in New York, the New York Times reported that the bill's passage spurred renewed activism from opponents in various places across the country.

On July 12, 2011, the Town Clerk of Barker, New York, Laura Fotusky, resigned her position because she objected to same-sex marriage and thus would not sign marriage certificates for same-sex couples. Her resignation came two weeks after another town clerk, from Volney, said she also objected to signing certificates but would not leave her position, saying a deputy clerk would have to do it. The organization New Yorkers for Constitutional Freedoms said it would match the $25,000 salary Fotusky surrendered when she resigned. Granby Town Clerk Ruth Sheldon did the same a few days later.  Ledyard Town Clerk Rose Marie Belforti made state and national headlines when she notified the town of Ledyard that she would not sign marriage certificates for same-sex couples due to her religious beliefs. Belforti later delegated marriage applications to a deputy. Same-sex marriage advocates and some town residents criticized Belforti for taking this action, and resident Ed Easter attempted to unseat her in the fall of 2011. Belforti was re-elected by a substantial margin.

On July 25, 2011, New Yorkers for Constitutional Freedoms, represented by Liberty Counsel, filed a lawsuit in the New York Supreme Court seeking an injunction against the Marriage Equality Act, alleging corruption and violations of the law in the process of passing the bill. On November 18, 2011, acting Supreme Court Justice Robert B. Wiggins ruled that the plaintiffs' case could proceed. Justice Wiggins allowed the plaintiffs' claims under the Open Meetings Law, but dismissed other portions of the case. Justice Wiggins' opinion included the following: "It is ironic that much of the state's brief passionately spews sanctimonious verbiage on the separation of powers in the governmental branches, and clear arm-twisting by the Executive on the Legislative permeates this entire process." On July 6, 2012, a five-judge panel of the Appellate Division ruled unanimously that no violation of the Open Meetings Law had occurred and dismissed the suit. On August 6, 2012, Liberty Counsel appealed to the New York Court of Appeals, which declined to hear the appeal on October 23.

Four Republican state senators−James Alesi, Mark Grisanti, Roy McDonald, and Stephen Saland−voted in favor of same-sex marriage. Of the four, only one−Mark Grisanti−was re-elected to the State Senate in 2012. On May 9, 2012, Alesi announced that he would not run for re-election and indicated that his vote on same-sex marriage would have "severely hampered" his chances in a Republican primary. Grisanti, McDonald, and Saland faced primary challenges in 2012. Grisanti won his primary by a large margin and got re-elected, but was defeated in 2014. McDonald lost the Republican primary to Saratoga County Clerk Kathleen Marchione, who went on to win the general election. Saland defeated primary challenger Neil Di Carlo by 107 votes, but lost the general election to Democrat Terry Gipson by a margin of approximately 2,000 votes.  Di Carlo appeared on the Conservative Party line, receiving approximately 15,000 votes. Grisanti was defeated by Democrat Marc Panepinto in the 2014 elections.

In 2011, after the legalization of same-sex marriage in New York, the Research Library at the Buffalo History Museum became the first known library in the United States to collect wedding memorabilia from legally-wed same-sex couples.

Recognition of out-of-state same-sex marriages
Prior to the passage of same-sex marriage legislation, there was litigation in New York courts regarding the recognition of same-sex marriage licenses from other jurisdictions.

In October 2004, State Comptroller Alan Hevesi indicated that the state's retirement system would recognize same-sex marriages performed outside New York State for purposes of state retirement and pension benefits. Not long thereafter, New York City Mayor Michael Bloomberg stated that he would ask that the city's five pension systems recognize domestic partnerships, civil unions, and same-sex marriages of city employees performed in other jurisdictions (such as Massachusetts, Canada, Iowa, New Hampshire, New Jersey, Vermont, Oregon, Maine, Hawaii, Colorado, Nevada, Wisconsin, Connecticut, California, the District of Columbia and Washington).

In February 2008, the Appellate Division, Fourth Department ruled that a same-sex marriage performed in Canada should be recognized in New York. In Martinez v. County of Monroe, the court reasoned that because out-of-state opposite-sex marriages that would not have been legal in New York nonetheless are recognized unless such recognition would violate the public policy of the state, out-of-state same-sex marriages must be similarly recognized. The Appellate Division reversed a trial judge's ruling in 2006 that Monroe Community College did not have to extend health benefits to an employee's same-sex spouse. Monroe County subsequently announced its intention to move for leave to appeal the decision to the Court of Appeals, New York State's highest court. However, the Court of Appeals refused to hear the case on May 6, 2008, allowing the lower court's ruling to stand. In November 2008, Monroe County announced that it would not pursue any further appeals of the Appellate Division's decision.

On May 29, 2008, Governor David Paterson directed all New York State agencies to begin to revise their policies and regulations to recognize same-sex marriages performed in other jurisdictions. Governor Paterson's directive cited the Appellate Division decision in the Martinez case, as well as several lower court rulings. As a result of the Governor's directive, New York became the first state that did not allow same-sex marriages, but whose state agencies recognized same-sex marriages performed elsewhere. In addition, same-sex couples in New York had the option to travel to states where same-sex marriage was possible to get married and have their marriages fully recognized by New York State agencies.

Governor Paterson's directive was challenged as both premature and unconstitutional in an Article 78 proceeding filed on June 3, 2008, against Governor Paterson by the Alliance Defense Fund on behalf of several state legislators and conservative leaders; this lawsuit failed at all levels. On September 2, 2008, Justice Lucy A. Billings, of the State Supreme Court in the Bronx, issued a decision that Governor Paterson acted within his powers when he required state agencies to recognize same-sex marriages from outside the state. Justice Billings found that the Governor's order was consistent with state laws on the recognition of marriages from other jurisdictions. The Court of Appeals agreed to hear this and another case on same-sex marriage recognition in 2009. The Court decided these cases on narrow grounds, finding that the state acted within its authority without reaching the issue of marriage recognition; however, a three-justice minority would have ruled more broadly in support of marriage recognition.

Economic impact
The New York City Comptroller's office issued an updated economic analysis in May 2009 finding that New York State's economy could gain $210 million in the three years immediately following the legalization of marriage for same-sex couples.

According to Mayor Michael Bloomberg, City Council Speaker Christine Quinn, NYC & Company CEO George Fertitta and New York City Clerk Michael McSweeney, "same sex-marriages in New York City have generated an estimated $259 million in economic impact and $16 million in City revenues" in the first year after the enactment of the Marriage Equality Act.

Marriage statistics

From July 2011 to December 2012, approximately 12,285 same-sex marriages were celebrated in the state of New York.

The New York State Department of Health has recorded the number of same-sex marriages performed in New York State (excluding New York City) since 2012, as shown in the table below. The counties of Erie, Suffolk and Westchester registered the most same-sex marriages.

Public opinion
An April 2009 Siena poll of likely New York voters indicated that 53% of voters supported same-sex marriage and 39% opposed it. The April poll showed that registered Democrats supported same-sex marriage by a 59% to 35% margin, while registered Republicans opposed it by virtually the same margin, 59% to 31%. A SurveyUSA poll from the same time period showed 49% of New Yorkers as supporting same-sex marriage with 44% opposed. However, a May 26 Siena poll indicated an even, 46%–46% split on the issue.

According to a Quinnipiac University poll released on May 14, 2009, New York voters were evenly split—46% to 46%—on same-sex marriage. The May 14 poll showed that same-sex marriage was opposed by majorities of African-Americans (57%–35%), Republicans (68%–24%), white Catholics (53%–39%), and white Protestants (55%–38%). However, a Quinnipiac poll dated June 23, 2009 showed that New York State voters support same-sex marriage 51-41 percent, with eight percent undecided. According to the June 23 poll, the proposal wins 52–42 percent support from white voters and 55–39 percent from Hispanics. African-American voters polled 43% in favor and 42% opposed.

In 2010, The New York Times estimated support for same-sex marriage in New York at 58%, based on projections from 2008 and a nationwide CNN poll in August 2010.

An April 2011 Siena College survey found that 58% of New York voters supported the legalization of same-sex marriage, while 36% were opposed and 6% did not know or had no opinion. A similar poll in May 2011 found that 55% supported legalization, 42% opposed it, and 5% didn't know or had no opinion. The June 2011 poll showed a 55%/50%/5% split.

Following the passage of the Marriage Equality Act, a Marist Poll reported that 55% of New York adults supported the legalization of same-sex marriage and 63% did not want the law overturned.

A December 2012 Quinnipiac University poll showed that New Yorkers widely favored same sex marriage. 60% favored same sex marriage, while 33% were opposed. 7% were unsure.

A December 2013 Public Religion Research Institute survey found that 60% of New York residents supported same-sex marriage, while 32% opposed it, and 9% didn't know or refused to answer.

A March 2014 Roanoke/Rutgers-Eagleton/Siena College study found that 65% of New York residents favored same-sex marriage, while 32% opposed. 3% were unsure.

A 2016 Public Religion Research Institute (PRRI) poll found a 66% majority in favor of same-sex marriage. 25% were opposed and 9% were unsure or undecided. In 2017, the PRRI found that 69% of New Yorkers supported same-sex marriage, while 24% were opposed and 7% were undecided.

Timeline
February 26, 2004: Jason West, mayor of the village of New Paltz, announces that the village would start performing same-sex civil weddings. Although the village would not attempt to issue licenses for such weddings, couples in New York State have six months from the wedding to seek such a license, and weddings are not invalid solely for not having a license.
February 27, 2004: John Shields, the Mayor of Nyack, New York, announces that his village would recognize same-sex marriages performed elsewhere.
March 2, 2004: West is charged with 19 misdemeanor counts of "solemnizing marriages without a license" by Ulster County District Attorney Donald Williams. West announces that he intends to continue performing same-sex marriage ceremonies.
March 3, 2004: Shields announces that he will begin officiating at same-sex marriages, and that he and his fiancé would join other gay and lesbian New Yorkers in seeking marriage licenses from municipal clerks' offices.
March 3, 2004: The Office of New York Attorney General Eliot Spitzer issues an "informal opinion" that clerks should not issue marriage licenses to same-sex couples as the State Legislature had not intended same-sex marriages to be covered by the Domestic Relations Law. The same opinion states that same-sex marriages performed elsewhere were recognizable in New York State under a recent judicial decision recognizing the validity of a Vermont civil union as granting the benefits of marriage, Langan v. St. Vincent's Hospital (later overturned).
March 5, 2004: New York State Judge Vincent Bradley issues a temporary restraining order barring West from performing any such ceremonies for a month. West indicates that he will abide by the judicial order while evaluating his legal options.
March 22, 2004: Following an opinion requested in January from their attorney, the Rochester City Council announces that Rochester will recognize same-sex marriages performed elsewhere. Rochester is across Lake Ontario from Toronto, where same-sex marriages have been legal since 2003.
October 8, 2004: The state comptroller, Alan G. Hevesi, indicated in a letter to a state employee that the state retirement system will recognize same-sex marriages contracted elsewhere for the purposes of retirement benefits for New York state employees.
February 4, 2005: State Supreme Court Justice Doris Ling-Cohan rules that New York City could not deny marriage licenses to same-sex couples, based on the Equal Protection Clause of the New York Constitution. The order was stayed for 30 days, pending an appeal. (The Supreme Court is a trial-level court in New York, and the decision could be appealed either to the Appellate Division or directly to the Court of Appeals.)
December 8, 2005: The Appellate Division of the New York Supreme Court overturns Ling-Cohan's decision.
July 6, 2006: The Court of Appeals in its Hernández v. Robles decision declines to judicially mandate the legalization of same-sex marriage in New York. The Court's ruling stated that same-sex partners did not have the right to marry under the New York Constitution.
May 2007 : A Massachusetts trial court judge rules that marriage licenses obtained by New York same-sex couples prior to the Hernandez v. Robles decision are valid under Massachusetts law. As a result, these couples' marriages are also valid under New York State law.
June 19, 2007: The Democrat-controlled New York State Assembly approves Governor Spitzer's bill to legalize same-sex marriage in New York, in an 85–61 vote. The bill moves to the Republican-controlled Senate; Majority Leader Joseph L. Bruno said it would not be voted upon in that chamber this year.
January 9, 2008: Governor Spitzer's bill to legalize same-sex marriage dies in the New York State Senate and is returned to the New York State Assembly.
February 1, 2008: In Martinez v. County of Monroe, the Appellate Division, Fourth Department rules that a same-sex marriage in Canada should be recognized in New York, because out-of-state opposite-sex marriages that would not have been legal in New York nonetheless are recognized unless such recognition would violate the public policy of the state. The Appellate Division holds that the same treatment must be applied to out-of-state same-sex marriages, but the ruling could be overturned on a finding that same-sex marriage violates New York's public policy. The decision reverses a trial judge's 2006 ruling that Monroe Community College did not have to extend health benefits to an employee's same-sex spouse.
March 12, 2008: Eliot Spitzer resigns his position as Governor of New York.
March 17, 2008: Following Spitzer's resignation, David Alexander Paterson (then Lieutenant Governor of New York) is sworn in as the 55th Governor of New York at the New York State Capitol by New York Chief Judge Judith Kaye.
April 2008: Governor David Alexander Paterson pledges in a speech that he will continue to push for full marriage equality for LGBT New Yorkers.
May 29, 2008: It is widely reported on this day that Governor David A. Paterson directed all state agencies to begin to revise their policies and regulations to recognize same-sex marriages performed in other jurisdictions. "In a directive issued on May 14, the governor's legal counsel, David Nocenti, instructed the agencies that gay couples married elsewhere 'should be afforded the same recognition as any other legally performed union.'" Opponents of same-sex marriage raise the possibility of a legal challenge.
June 3, 2008: Governor Paterson's directive is challenged as both premature and unconstitutional in an Article 78 proceeding filed by the Alliance Defense Fund on behalf of several state legislators and conservative leaders in New York.
September 2, 2008: The Alliance Defense Fund suit is dismissed in State Supreme Court in the Bronx, with a finding that Governor Patterson acted within his powers when he required state agencies to recognize same-sex marriages from outside NY State.
September 8, 2008: The Alliance Defense Fund appeals Judge Billings' decision.
November 4, 2008: On Election Day, the Democratic Party gains a majority in the New York State Senate.
November 22, 2008: Monroe County announces that it will not pursue any further appeals of the Appellate Division's decision.
December 2008: A deal is made among certain Democratic senators that would ensure the election of Malcolm Smith as Senate president pro tempore, making him the chamber's leader; reports indicate that as part of the deal, Senator Smith agreed not to bring same-sex marriage legislation to a floor vote in the Senate during the 2009–2010 legislative session.
December 10, 2008: Malcolm Smith breaks off his alleged agreement with three Democratic dissidents and confirms that he will not pledge to hold off on a same-sex marriage bill in the upcoming session. Senator Smith states that "real reform cannot and should not ever include limiting the civil rights of any New Yorkers." This places control of the Senate by the Democratic Party in doubt, despite its slight numerical majority.
January 7, 2009: After reaching an agreement with three Democratic dissidents, Malcolm Smith is voted Senate Majority Leader.
April 16, 2009: Governor Paterson officially introduces same-sex marriage legislation and vows to push for its passage.
May 12, 2009: The New York State Assembly passes same-sex marriage legislation in a bipartisan vote of 89–52.
November 19, 2009: The New York Court of Appeals rules in Godfrey v. Spano that Westchester County could lawfully extend government benefits to same-sex couples in out-of-state marriages. Whether New York same-sex couples will be permitted to marry in their own home state lies in the hands of the New York State Senate. This decision provides New York couples with the peace of mind of knowing that their valid out-of-state marriages will be respected in New York.
December 2, 2009: The New York State Assembly again passes the same-sex marriage bill by a vote of 88–51, but the state Senate votes it down, 38-24.
May 10, 2011: Assemblyman Daniel O'Donnell introduces a same-sex marriage bill in the Assembly.
June 15, 2011: The New York State Assembly passes the same-sex marriage bill for the fourth time, by a vote of 80–63.
June 24, 2011: The New York Senate passes the same-sex marriage bill in a 33 to 29 vote. Governor Andrew Cuomo signs the bill, which takes effect in 30 days.
July 24, 2011: The Marriage Equality Act goes into effect. Kitty Lambert and Cheryle Rudd of Buffalo are wed in Niagara Falls at midnight, becoming the first couple in the state to benefit from the newly enacted law. Niagara Falls is lit in rainbow for the first time for the occasion.

Timeline of civil suits for same-sex marriage
Several court cases pertaining to the recognition and licensing of same-sex marriages in New York have been filed over the years.

Hernández case
March 5, 2004: Five same-sex couples, backed by Lambda Legal, file suit challenging the constitutionality of limiting marriage to only opposite-sex couples. The complaint relied on both equal protection and due process claims.
February 4, 2005: New York County Supreme Court Judge Doris Ling-Cohan issues an opinion in Hernández v. Robles ruling that the New York State Constitution guaranteed basic rights to gays and lesbians, which the state violates when it prevents them from marrying. Ling-Cohan stayed her ruling for a 30-day period, giving the state time to appeal.
September 13, 2005: Oral arguments are heard by the Appellate Division of the Supreme Court, First Judicial Department.
December 8, 2005: The Appellate Division reverses the trial court with one dissent in a 4–1 decision that said the issue should be handled by the Legislature.
May 31, 2006: After the couples filed an appeal, oral arguments are heard by the New York State Court of Appeals (New York's highest court).
July 6, 2006: The Court of Appeals issues a 4–2 decision upholding New York's existing marriage statutes and declining to mandate the legalization of same-sex marriage in New York. The Court's ruling states that same-sex partners do not have the right to marry each other under the New York Constitution. It rejects the plaintiffs' attempt to use the U.S. Supreme Court's ruling in Loving v. Virginia (1967) as precedent because "a long and shameful history of racism lay behind the kind of statute invalidated in Loving" while "the traditional definition of marriage is not merely a by-product of historical injustice".

Shields case
March 11, 2004: Ten same-sex couples file suit to obtain an order requiring their town clerk to issue them marriage licenses and the Department of Health to recognize them. If the statutory argument fails, the suit challenges the constitutionality of the Domestic Relations Law. John Shields, Mayor of Nyack, New York, was one of the parties to the suit.
October 18, 2004: Rockland County Supreme Court Judge Alfred J. Weiner issues an opinion in Shields v. Madigan rejecting the statutory interpretation and constitutional challenges for same-sex marriage. The Domestic Relations Law was determined to allow only opposite-sex marriages, and equal protection and due process claims were both denied.
March 28, 2006: Oral arguments are heard by the Appellate Division of the Supreme Court, Second Judicial Department.
July 6, 2006: The Court of Appeals issues a 4–2 decision in the four other marriage cases. This case is now effectively moot.

Samuels case
April 7, 2004: Thirteen same-sex couples, backed by the American Civil Liberties Union, file suit to have the state's marriage laws declared unconstitutional. Daniel O'Donnell, New York State Assemblyman (and brother of celebrity Rosie O'Donnell), is one of the parties to the suit.
December 7, 2004: Albany County Supreme Court Judge Joseph C. Teresi issues an opinion in Samuels v. New York State Department of Health rejecting the four constitutional claims for same-sex marriage. Equal protection based on sexual orientation, equal protection based on gender, due process, and free speech were all argued to be violated by New York's Domestic Relations Law, but none was found to have merit.
October 17, 2005: Oral arguments are heard by the Appellate Division of the Supreme Court, Third Judicial Department.
February 16, 2006: The Appellate Division affirms the trial court in a 5–0 decision that consolidated all three cases (Samuels, Seymour, and Kane; see below) on appeal in its jurisdiction.
May 31, 2006: Oral arguments are heard by the New York State Court of Appeals.
July 6, 2006: The Court of Appeals issues a 4–2 decision upholding New York's existing marriage statutes and declining to judicially mandate the legalization of same-sex marriage in New York. The Court's ruling states that same-sex partners do not have the right to marry each other under the New York Constitution.

Seymour case
June 2, 2004: Twenty-five same-sex couples, backed by the city of Ithaca, file suit to have the Domestic Relations Law include same-sex marriage. If the law is determined not to apply to same-sex couples, the suit challenges the prohibition on a constitutional basis.
February 23, 2005: Tompkins County Supreme Court Judge Robert C. Mulvey issues an opinion in Seymour v. Holcomb rejecting Ithaca's standing to sue, the statutory claim, and the constitutional claims based on equal protection, due process, and free expression.
October 17, 2005: Oral arguments are heard by the Appellate Division of the Supreme Court, Third Judicial Department.
February 16, 2006: The Appellate Division affirms the trial court in a 5–0 decision that consolidated all three cases (Samuels, Seymour, and Kane) on appeal in its jurisdiction.
May 31, 2006: Oral arguments are heard by the New York State Court of Appeals.
July 6, 2006: The Court of Appeals issues a 4–2 decision upholding New York's existing marriage statutes and declining to judicially mandate the legalization of same-sex marriage in New York. The Court's ruling states that same-sex partners do not have the right to marry each other under the New York Constitution.

Kane case
June 16, 2004: Two same-sex couples file suit to obtain marriage licenses that would make official their marriage ceremonies from three months earlier. The ceremonies were held by a Unitarian Universalist minister on March 27, 2004.
January 31, 2005: Albany County Supreme Court Judge E. Michael Kavanagh issues an opinion in Kane v. Marsolais rejecting both statutory and constitutional claims. The opinion also rejected the notion that their marriages were valid because of a section of the Domestic Relations Law that recognized marriages solemnized by ceremonies even if the couple failed to obtain a license. This section of the law was held only to apply to those who were legally qualified to be married.
October 17, 2005: Oral arguments are heard by the Appellate Division of the Supreme Court, Third Judicial Department.
February 16, 2006: The Appellate Division affirms the trial court in a 5–0 decision that consolidated all three cases (Samuels, Seymour, and Kane) on appeal in its jurisdiction.
May 31, 2006: Oral arguments are heard by the New York State Court of Appeals.
July 6, 2006: The Court of Appeals issues a 4–2 decision upholding New York's existing marriage statutes and declining to judicially mandate the legalization of same-sex marriage in New York. The Court's ruling states that same-sex partners do not have the right to marry each other under the New York Constitution.

Legislative history

See also
 Empire State Pride Agenda
 History of civil marriage in the United States
 LGBT rights in New York
 LGBT culture in New York City
 List of self-identified LGBTQ New Yorkers
 Public opinion of same-sex marriage in the United States
 Rights and responsibilities of marriages in the United States
 Same-sex marriage in the United States
 Same-sex marriage law in the United States by state
 Same-sex marriage legislation in the United States
 Same-sex marriage status in the United States by state
 Stonewall riots

Explanatory notes

References

External links
 Hernandez v. Robles, M.Y. Court of Appeals, July 6, 2006
 "The Road to Gay Marriage After New York", JURIST
 

LGBT rights in New York (state)
New York
2011 in LGBT history
2011 in New York (state)